Molalla River School District is a public school district serving Molalla, Oregon, United States, and the surrounding area of Clackamas County, including the communities of Clarkes, Mulino and Rural Dell. It is named after the Molalla River.

Demographics
In the 2009 school year, the district had 61 students classified as homeless by the Department of Education, or 2.1% of students in the district.

High school
The district has two high schools, Molalla High School, in Molalla serving grades 9-12.  It had 841 students. and its charter school, Renaissance Public Academy serving grades 3–12

Middle school
The district has three middle schools:
 Molalla River Middle School, in Molalla serving grades 6-8; it had 703 students and its two charter schools:
 Molalla River Academy serving grades K–8
 Renaissance Public Academy serving grades 3–12

Elementary schools
The district has four elementary schools:
 Clarkes Elementary in Clarkes (185 students; grades K-5) - established over 100 years ago
 Molalla Elementary School in Molalla (395 students; grades K-5) - Principal: Frank Luzaich  
 Mulino Elementary School in Mulino
 Rural Dell Elementary School in Rural Dell (235 students; grades K-5) - established over 150 years ago
 Molalla River Academy serving grades K–8
 Renaissance Public Academy serving grades (100 students; grades 3–12) - Administrator: Nicole Hans - in the historic Maple Grove Elementary school 

Former elementary school
 Dickey Prairie Elementary School southeast of Molalla - established in 1889; closed in 2009
 Maple Grove Elementary School south of Molalla – established in 1888 (in its current building since 1929); closed in 2010

Charter schools
There are two charter schools in the district: Molalla River Academy (grades K-8) and Renaissance Public Academy (grades 4–12). Molalla River Academy was established in the former Dickey Prairie school building.  Renaissance Public Academy was established in the former Maple Grove school building.

References

External links
 

School districts in Oregon
Education in Clackamas County, Oregon
Molalla, Oregon